The Explosion Show is a television series that premiered on the Science Channel in January 2020.

Episodes

See also

 2020 in American television

References

External links

2020 American television series debuts
Science Channel original programming